Edward Matthew Farrell (March 31, 1854 – August 6, 1931) was a Canadian printer, publisher, and politician from the province of Nova Scotia.

Born in Liverpool, Nova Scotia, the son of Patrick Farrell and Mary Ann (Shea) Farrell, Farrell was educated in public schools in Liverpool. From 1888 to 1896, he was the Chief Deputy Sheriff in Queens County, Nova Scotia. In 1896, he was acclaimed to the Nova Scotia House of Assembly for the electoral district of Queen's County. A Nova Scotia Liberal, he was re-elected in 1897, 1901, and 1906. From 1905 to 1910, he was the Speaker of the House of Assembly of Nova Scotia. A Roman Catholic, he was summoned to the Senate of Canada on the advice of Prime Minister Wilfrid Laurier for the senatorial division of Liverpool, Nova Scotia. A Liberal, he served until his death in 1931.

References
 
 

1854 births
1931 deaths
Canadian senators from Nova Scotia
Liberal Party of Canada senators
Nova Scotia Liberal Party MLAs
Speakers of the Nova Scotia House of Assembly